Glinka may refer to:

Places
Glinka, Lower Silesian Voivodeship (south-west Poland)
Glinka, Busko County, a village in south-central Poland
Glinka, Ostrowiec County, a village in south-central Poland
Glinka, Silesian Voivodeship (south Poland)
Glinka, Braniewo County in Warmian-Masurian Voivodeship (north Poland)
Glinka, Kętrzyn County in Warmian-Masurian Voivodeship (north Poland)
Glinka, West Pomeranian Voivodeship (north-west Poland)
Glinka, Russia, several rural localities in Russia
Glinka (crater), an impact crater on Mercury

Other uses
Glinka (surname)
Mikhail Glinka, 19th century Russian composer
Konstantin Glinka, a Russian soil scientist
The Great Glinka, a 1945 Soviet film
Composer Glinka, a 1952 Soviet film directed by Grigori Aleksandrov.

See also
 
 Hlinka (Czech, Slovak, Ukrainian form)